Legend of the Dragon is a fighting game for the Wii, PlayStation 2 and PlayStation Portable. It was developed by French company Neko Entertainment and published by The Game Factory on May 1, 2007. The story follows the animated series of the same name.

Gameplay
The game's roster features 24 characters from the series. Players are able to move around freely in the outside universe or places of combat. Locations featured in the series are present in the game as combat arenas: the 12 Sacred Temples, the Dragon Dojo, the Zodiac Master's hideout, the Temple of Shadow Dragon, the Great Wall of China, and Hong Kong Bay. Eight game modes are present for players to choose from: Play Quest, Arcade, Training, Survival, Time Attack, Versus, Team Battle, and Tag.

Reception

Legend of the Dragon received negative reviews from critics. On Metacritic, the game holds scores of 29/100 for the PlayStation 2 version based on 4 reviews, and 37/100 for the Wii version based on 14 reviews, and 36/100 for the PSP version based on 12 reviews. On GameRankings, the game holds scores of 28.50% for the PlayStation 2 version based on 4 reviews, 42.07% for the PSP version based on 14 reviews, and 39.50% for the Wii version based on 14 reviews. Various publications criticized the game for poor graphics and animations, lack of variety in fighting moves for the characters, and poor controls for the Wii version.

References

2007 video games
3D fighting games
PlayStation 2 games
PlayStation Portable games
Video games based on television series
Video games developed in France
Wii games
Multiplayer and single-player video games
Neko Entertainment games
The Game Factory games